La Dépêche marocaine was a daily francophone Moroccan newspaper published in Tangier.

History and profile
La Dépêche marocaine is considered the oldest published newspaper in Morocco after being founded by Rober-Raynaud in 1905. The paper reported the use of chemical weapons against the Rif during the war between Spain and Morocco on 27 November 1921.

In 1951, Le Monde journalist Claude Julien became its editor-in-chief. The newspaper ceased to be published in 1961. It was the only paper published in French in Morocco until its disestablishment.

There exist collections of the newspaper in volumes in both the Bibliothèque nationale de France and the Library of Congress.

See also
 List of newspapers in Morocco
Presse Maroc - جريدة إلكترونية مغربية

References

External links
 What do you think of Picasso? - Essay by Jean Tabaud published by La Dépêche marocaine in February 1950
 La Dépêche marocaine WorldCat. Retrieved 13 February 2014.

1905 establishments in Morocco
1961 disestablishments in Morocco
History of Tangier
Defunct newspapers published in Morocco
Newspapers established in 1905
Publications disestablished in 1961
Mass media in Tangier
French-language newspapers published in Morocco